EN 50090 is a European standard for Home and Building Electronic Systems (HBES) open communications, issued by CENELEC. It covers any combination of electronic devices linked via a digital transmission network to provide automated, decentralised and distributed process control for domestic and commercial and building applications; for example the control of lighting, heating, food preparation, washing, energy management, water, fire alarms, blinds, security, etc.

Part 1: Standardization structure 

 EN 50090-1:2011

Part 2: System overview 

 EN 50090-2-1:1996 : Architecture - withdrawn and replaced by EN 50090-1:2011
EN 50090-2-2:1996 & A2:2007 : General technical requirements (concerns cabling and topology, electrical and functional safety, environmental conditions and behavior in case of failures as well as specific installation rules) - partially replaced by EN IEC 63044-3:2018 Home and Building Electronic Systems (HBES) and Building Automation and Control Systems (BACS). Electrical safety requirements, EN 50491-5-2:2010 Environmental conditions, EN 50491-5-3:2010 and EN 50491-5-1:2010 EMC requirements
 EN 50090-2-3:2005 : General functional safety requirements - withdrawn and replaced by EN 50491-4-1:2012

Part 3: Aspects of application 

 EN 50090-3-1:1994 : Introduction to the application structure
 EN 50090-3-2:2004 : User process  for HBES Class 1, twisted pair (asynchronous character-oriented data transfer in a half duplex bi-directional communication mode, using a specifically unbalanced/unsymmetrical (Type 0) or balanced/symmetrical (Type 1) baseband signal coding with collision avoidance under SELV conditions)
 EN 50090-3-3:2009 : Interworking model and common data types (so that different manufacturers' products send and receive datagrams and are able to properly understand and react on them without the need for translators or gateways as well as common configuration tools, training, etc.)
EN 50090-3-4:2017: Secure application layer, secure service, secure configuration and security resources (based on ISO/IEC 24767-2 Home Network Secure Communication Protocol for Middleware - important for anti-intrusion security)

Part 4: Media independent layers 

 EN 50090-4-1:2004 : Application layer for HBES Class 1 (specifies services that can be used for both management and run-time communication)
 EN 50090-4-2:2004 : Transport layer, network layer and general parts of data link layer for HBES Class 1 (provides the communication stack for the data link layer, the network layer and the transport layer)
EN 50090-4-3:2015 : Communication over IP

Part 5: Media and media dependent layers 

EN 50090-5-1:2005 : Power line for HBES Class 1 (defines the medium-specific physical and data link layer of power line Class 1 in two variations, PL110 and PL132)
 EN 50090-5-2:2004 : Network based on HBES Class1 (defines the medium-specific physical and data link layer for twisted pair in its two variations, TP0 and TP1)
EN 50090-5-3 2006 : Radio frequency (defines requirements for the RF physical and data link layer)

Part 6: Interfaces 

EN 50090-6-1:2017 : Webservice interface (defines a standardized web service-based interface with other IT systems via a gateway device)

Part 7: System Management 

EN 50090-7-1:2004 : Management procedures (capturing the dynamics of managing distributed resources on the network in terms of a sequence of telegrams, exchanged between two partners: the management client and the management server)

Part 8: Conformity assessment 

 EN 50090-8:2000 : Conformity assessment of products

Part 9: Installation requirements 

 EN 50090-9-1:2004 : Generic cabling for HBES Class 1 (provides cabling planning and installation rules taking into account the layout of the cable support, cables and connectors, and commissioning)

References

External links 

 Site map for the CENELEC website

50090
Electronics standards